Epischidia fulvostrigella is a species of snout moth in the genus Epischidia. It was described by Eduard Friedrich Eversmann in 1844. It is found in Russia, Romania and Spain.

References

Moths described in 1844
Phycitini
Moths of Europe